Pseudophistomis pallida is a species of beetle in the family Cerambycidae, the only species in the genus Pseudophistomis.

References

Lepturinae